Ludwig Hartau (19 February 1877 – 24 November 1922) was a German actor.

Selected filmography
 The Dancer (1915)
 Hungernde Millionäre (1919)
 Baccarat (1919)
 The Three Dances of Mary Wilford (1920)
 Anna Boleyn (1920)
 Four Around a Woman (1921)
 Marie Antoinette, the Love of a King (1922)
 Maciste and the Silver King's Daughter (1922)
 Napoleon's Daughter (1922)
 Two Worlds (1922)
 Today's Children (1922)
 The Treasure of Gesine Jacobsen (1923)
 The Beautiful Girl (1923)

Bibliography
 Jung, Uli & Schatzberg, Walter. Beyond Caligari: The Films of Robert Wiene. Berghahn Books, 1999.

External links

1877 births
1922 deaths
People from Żmigród
People from the Province of Silesia
German male film actors
German male stage actors
German male silent film actors
20th-century German male actors